Whittington is a civil parish in Shropshire, England.  In the parish are 24 listed buildings that are recorded in the National Heritage List for England.  Of these, three are listed at Grade I, the highest of the three grades, and the others are at Grade II, the lowest grade.  The parish contains the village of Whittington and the surrounding countryside.  The oldest listed building consists of the remains of Whittington Castle, which is listed at Grade I and is a scheduled monument.  Most of the other listed buildings are houses, cottages, farmhouses and farm buildings, the oldest of which are timber framed, or have a timber framed core.  In the parish are two country houses, the largest of which, Halston Hall, is listed at Grade I, as is its domestic chapel, and other buildings associated with it are listed at Grade II.  The rest of the listed buildings include a church, a sundial in the churchyard, a public house, a bridge over the Montgomery Canal, a former railway station, and a former level crossing keeper's cottage.


Key

Buildings

References

Citations

Sources

Lists of buildings and structures in Shropshire